Tangan may refer to:
 Tangan River, a river in Bengal
 Tangan, a village in Xinning, Guangxi, China
 Tangan, Kurdistan, a village in Iran

See also 
 Tangan-tangan, a tree of the Mariana Islands
 Tanggang
 Tongan (disambiguation)